John Judson Aiken (January 1, 1932 – November 2, 2021) was an American ice hockey goaltender. He played one game for the Montreal Canadiens in the National Hockey League during the 1957–1958 season.

Aiken was spectating at the Canadiens versus Boston Bruins match on March 13, 1958, when Canadiens goaltender Jacques Plante was seriously injured during the second period. Aiken, who was the Bruins' practice goaltender, was called out of the crowd to take Plante's place. Aiken made twelve saves and allowed six goals in a 7–3 Boston victory.

Career statistics

Regular season and playoffs

See also
List of players who played only one game in the NHL

References

External links

1932 births
2021 deaths
American men's ice hockey goaltenders
Arlington Catholic High School alumni
Boston University Terriers men's ice hockey players
Ice hockey players from Massachusetts
Montreal Canadiens players
People from Arlington, Massachusetts
Sportspeople from Middlesex County, Massachusetts